Sinirhodobacter ferrireducens is a Gram-negative, facultative anaerobic and Fe(III) oxide-reducing bacterium from the genus Sinirhodobacter.

References 

Rhodobacteraceae
Bacteria described in 2013